The following is a list of recurring Saturday Night Live characters and sketches introduced during the forty-fourth season of SNL, which began on September 29, 2018.

Thirsty Cops
Officer Smith (Ego Nwodim) and her partner are open to sexually harassing their male convict with the assistance of Paula Hauser (Kate McKinnon).

Deidre
A pretentious couple, Deidre (Heidi Gardner) and her significant other, played by the host, describe their vacation during a late-night dinner party.

Baskin Johns
An employee for Goop (Heidi Gardner) appears on Weekend Update.

Brothers
Two brothers Spencer and Jared, played by Beck Bennett and Kyle Mooney, argue and fight in front of their parents, played by Cecily Strong and the host, and neighbors the Campbells

The War in Words
In a war documentary series, a war is shown through the lens of the letters and correspondence between a military couple. The soldier in the war (Mikey Day) becomes increasingly concerned, confused, and exasperated, as the letters of his wife back at home (played by the host) grow more absurd.

An earlier version of the sketch appeared on Maya & Marty in 2016, depicting Civil War letters between Pvt. Trenton McGuire of the 2nd Pennsylvania infantry (Day) and wife Elizabeth (Maya Rudolph).  A 2013 SNL sketch, "Civil War Love Letters," was also similar; it featured host Jennifer Lawrence as Madeline, writing eloquent letters to her fiancé Gregory (Tim Robinson), whose responses consisted mainly of demands for explicit photographs of her.

Jules, Who Sees Things a Little Differently
Jules (Beck Bennett) appears on Weekend Update to give his unique perspective on things.

Them Trumps
The Trump family is reimagined as an African-American family, featuring Kenan Thompson as Donald Trump parody Darius Trump, Leslie Jones as Melania Trump parody Malika Trump, Chris Redd as Donald Trump Jr. parody Darius Trump Jr, and Ego Nwodim as Ivanka Trump parody L'evanka Trump. The sketches typically aired during weeks where the real Donald Trump had come seemingly close to impeachment, and the joke would come when Darius Trump would attempt to reassure his family that as the President of the United States, people would have to treat him fairly, even though he was a black man. Upon saying this, he would usually be impeached, booed, or even arrested.

Travel Expert Carrie Krum
Played by Aidy Bryant, Carrie Krum is a 7th grader who appears on Weekend Update as a travel expert, usually reporting on where she went on a school trip or on her summer vacation.

Name Change Office
A correspondent (Mikey Day) for Action 9 News at Five (which is itself a recurring sketch) covers a disaster that happened at the city's name change office. The reporter interviews people who were intending to change their embarrassing names but couldn't due to the disaster. The interviewed victims' names are usually played for comic effect, usually resembling an inappropriate, sexual term (such as Mike Rodick, for "microdick") or the name of a well-known criminal (for example, Jeffrey Epstein). Pete Davidson also plays an essential worker that laughs at the names at a press conference (usually held by the host).

Nico Slobkin and Brie Bacardi
A seemingly ideal couple (Mikey Day and Heidi Gardner) constantly bicker on Weekend Update.

Ultimate Baking Championship
Four contestants—Sandy (Heidi Gardner), Ralph (Kyle Mooney), another cast member, and the host—on a baking competition show present their confections to judges and the host, usually horribly-made cakes resembling popular characters that look nothing like the intended product. Alex Moffat plays the show's host, and Aidy Bryant, Beck Bennett, and Ego Nwodim play the judges.

Supercentenarian Mort Fellner
Mort Fellner (Mikey Day) reports on supercentenarian news, always involving the death of a supercentenarian.

Line Dancing
Daniel (played by John Mulaney) feels nervous at his partner Lisa's (played by Ego Nwodim) family event, but when they begin line dancing, he seems to know different lyrics and friends more than her.

Smokery Farms
Vaneta and Wylene Starkie (Kate McKinnon and Aidy Bryant) show meat products from their brand Smokery Farms and tell outlandish stories behind them.

Henriette and Nan
Two receptionists (Kate McKinnon and Aidy Bryant) struggle with technology.

Terry Fink
A film critic (Alex Moffat) reviews movies by "microdosing" on LSD.

What's Wrong with This Picture?
Three dense contestants try to guess what is wrong with a picture in a game show hosted by Elliott Pants (Kenan Thompson).

References 

Lists of recurring Saturday Night Live characters and sketches
Saturday Night Live in the 2010s